is a 2011 Japanese drama film directed by Ryuichi Hiroki. The film stars Anne Suzuki, Kengo Kora, Sora Aoi, Kaoru Kobayashi, Mako Midori and Jun Murakami. It is based on the novel Keibetsu by Kenji Nakagami.

Cast
 Anne Suzuki
 Kengo Kora
 Sora Aoi
 Yasushi Fuchikami
 Kaoru Kobayashi
 Mako Midori
 Jun Murakami
 Toshie Negishi
 Nao Ohmori
 Shûgo Oshinari
 Tomorō Taguchi

References

External links
 

2010s Japanese-language films
2011 films
2011 drama films
Films shot in Japan
Japanese drama films
Films based on Japanese novels
2010s Japanese films